Đurađ Balšić may refer to:

 Đurađ I Balšić, Lord of Zeta 1362–1378
 Đurađ II Balšić, Lord of Zeta 1385–1403